5-OH-DPAT is a synthetic compound that acts as a dopamine receptor agonist with selectivity for the D2 receptor and D3 receptor subtypes. Only the (S)-enantiomer is active as an agonist, with the (R)-enantiomer being a weak antagonist at D2 receptors. Radiolabelled 11C-5-OH-DPAT is used as an agonist radioligand for mapping the distribution and function of D2 and D3 receptors in the brain, and the drug is also being studied in the treatment of Parkinson's disease.

See also 
 7-OH-DPAT
 8-OH-DPAT

References 

Phenols
Dopamine agonists
Aminotetralins